Zephyranthes refugiensis, the Refugio zephyrlily, is a rare plant species known from only two counties in southern Texas (Goliad and Refugio).

Zephyranthes refugiensis is a perennial herb producing bulbs. Flowers are funnel-shaped, lemon-yellow, usually solitary.

References

External links
photo of herbarium specimen at Missouri Botanical Garden, isotype of Zephyranthes refugiensis

refugiensis
Plants described in 1961
Flora of Texas